The 1951 Claxton Shield was the 12th annual Claxton Shield, and was held in Adelaide from 28 July to 4 August. The participants were hosts South Australia, defending champions New South Wales, Victoria, Western Australia and Queensland. The series was won by an undefeated New South Wales, their sixth Shield title.

Results

References

1951 in baseball
1951 in Australian sport
1951
July 1951 sports events in Australia
August 1951 sports events in Australia